Charles Robert Thatcher (1830–1878) was a notable New Zealand singer, entertainer and songwriter. He was born in Bristol, England in 1830. He was married to singer Annie Vitelli.

References

1830 births
1878 deaths
New Zealand singer-songwriters
English emigrants to New Zealand
19th-century New Zealand male singers